Hendrick's Gin is a brand of gin produced by William Grant & Sons at the Girvan distillery, Scotland, and launched in 1999. The brand was created by spirits marketer Steven Grasse, while the gin itself was conceived by Lesley Gracie, a Yorkshire native, who was hired by William Grant & Sons to work in new liquid development for some of their products. A decade later she was tasked with creating a new super-premium gin. In addition to the traditional juniper infusion, Hendrick's uses Bulgarian rose and cucumber to add flavour. Hendrick's gin is bottled in a dark brown, apothecary-style bottle.

Spirits

Distillation
Hendrick's uses a blend of spirits produced from a Carter-Head Still (constructed in 1948), of which there are only a few in the world, and a small pot still, built in 1860 by Bennett, Sons & Shears.  Both have been restored to working order after being bought at auction in the 1960s by the former William Grant Life President, Charles Gordon. The two stills produce strikingly different styles of gin due to their different construction and methods of distillation.

The pot still is generally referred to as the Bennett still. The still is quite small, which allows most of the botanical flavour characteristics to pass into the spirit.  The still is filled with neutral spirit, and the botanical recipe added with some water.  This is left to steep for 24 hours, which begins the process of extracting the flavour from the botanicals.  The still is then heated by an external steam jacket to boil the liquid.  As the pot begins to boil, vapours move up the short column of the still to the condenser, where they condense and are collected.  First runnings can be as high as 92% alcohol, with a gradual decrease in the strength as the distillation progresses.  Once all of the alcohol is collected, the final spirit will be approximately 75%  alcohol v/v.  This spirit is heavy, oily, and smells strongly of juniper.

In contrast, the spirit derived from the Carter-Head still is much more subtle with light floral and sweet fragrances.  Its method of production is quite different, with only the neutral spirit and water added to the pot.  All botanicals used with the Carter-Head are added to a flavour basket at the very top of the still.  Rather than boiling the botanicals, which produces the strong pungent spirit of the Bennett still, the Carter-Head bathes the botanicals in the alcohol vapours only.  As these rise up through the still, they enter the base of the botanicals basket.  Inside, the botanicals are contained in copper baskets, which hold them together while allowing the vapours to be fully exposed.  As the evaporated alcohol moves through the botanicals, it efficiently extracts their flavours, which are carried out of the basket along with the alcohol until they reach the condenser.  Only the lighter, sweeter and floral flavours can be extracted by this method, which gives the spirit its distinctive character.

The final Hendrick's gin is a blend of these two spirits, with an addition of cucumber essence and rose petal essence.

Serving

Hendrick's suggests that the gin be served with tonic water over ice garnished with cucumber instead of the traditional citrus. Hendrick’s Gin’s Master Distiller, Lesley Gracie, suggests an alternative serving, in which the gin is mixed with soda water and elderflower cordial.

Awards and reviews
The Wall Street Journal described Hendrick's as the "Best Gin in the World" in 2003. Other spirit ratings organisations generally have been very complimentary as well. The San Francisco World Spirits Competition, for example, awarded two double gold, two gold, and three silver medals between 2005 and 2012. The Beverage Testing Institute gave the gin well-above-average scores of 93, 94 and 95 between 2007 and 2011.

Gin Foundry states that it's "been spearheading gin’s resurgence since the early 2000s", Mark Dawkins of Langleys's said it was "the catalyst for gin going to the next level", while gin blog From the Gin Shelf said it's "a true pioneer of marketing and flavour."

Other Products
In addition to their spirits, Hendrick's has produced Hendrick's themed products, such as glasses, tea pots, tea cups, jiggers, cucumber curler, pourers and more novelty items such as a small display bathtub and a magnifying glass bottle display.

In conjunction with the release of Hendrick's Lunar Gin and the first Full moon of 2021, Hendrick's released their Moon Bathing Kit early that January. It contained goggles, jasmine-scented lotion, a moonstone, blanket, gin glasses, and a cocktail spoon.

In 2021 Hendrick's Pickles were teased as an April Fools' Day joke on Instagram, but after overwhelming support and requests from people imploring them to make such a product, later in September it was announced Hendrick's would partner with Katz's Delicatessen to make gin inspired pickles. Master Distiller, Ms. Lesley Gracie collaborated with Katz’s owner Jake Dell, to create a brine that featured gin standard juniper and cubeb berries, with an additional emphasis on coriander, a botanical shared by both Katz’s pickles and Hendrick's Gin.

With the release of Neptunia Gin, in March 2022, Hendrick's released a Magic-of-the-Sea Spa Kit. This included Custom-designed Seashell Headphones, Sea Salt & Surf Scented Candle, Ocean Waves Bluetooth Projector, Ishga Seaweed & Rose Face Mask, 2 Crystal Highball Glasses and 2 Octopus Drink Stirrers.

References

External links 

Proof66.com Ratings and Reviews Aggregator for Identifying the Best Gin and Liquor 

Gins
Alcoholic drink brands
Scottish brands
Products introduced in 1999
William Grant & Sons